Yimella lutea is a Gram-positive, halotolerant and non-motile bacterium from the genus Yimella which has been isolated from a contaminated agar plate from the Yunnan Institute of Microbiology in China.

References

 

Micrococcales
Bacteria described in 2010